Ekangala is a large township falling under the City of Tshwane in the Gauteng province of South Africa. It lies remotely in Gauteng, tucked into the border with Mpumalanga to the east.

References

Populated places in the City of Tshwane
Townships in Gauteng